Peter Stephen Neutze (born 5 September 1963 in Auckland) is a former New Zealand cricketer. Neutze played 15 first-class cricket matches and six limited-over matches for Auckland, Northern Districts and Otago between 1985 and 1990.

Neutze was a right-arm leg-spin bowler. His best innings figures came in his debut match when he took 5 for 109 for Otago against Central Districts in January 1985. His best match figures came four years later for Auckland, when he took seven wickets – 4 for 41 and 3 for 71 – against Central Districts in February 1989. A tail-end batsman, in his last first-class match in February 1990 he scored 40 for Northern Districts, adding 85 for the ninth wicket in 53 minutes with Brendon Bracewell against Otago.

References

External links
 

1963 births
Living people
New Zealand cricketers
Auckland cricketers
Northern Districts cricketers
Otago cricketers